"Goodbye to You" is a song by Swedish pop music duo Roxette, released on 3 December 1986 by EMI as the second single from their debut studio album, Pearls of Passion (1986). The song was written by Per Gessle, and was backed by album track "So Far Away". It was only released commercially on 7" vinyl exclusively in Sweden, although a limited test pressing 12" vinyl was also created, containing an exclusive remix of the song. The single peaked at number nine on the Swedish Singles Chart. No music video was created for the track.

Formats and track listings
All lyrics and music written by Per Gessle, except "So Far Away" lyrics by Gessle and Hasse Huss	

 7" Single (1362507)
 "Goodbye to You" – 4:00
 "So Far Away" – 5:13

 Promo 12" Single (1362516)
 "Goodbye to You"  – 6:43
 "Goodbye to You" – 4:00
 "So Far Away" – 5:13

Personnel
Credits adapted from the liner notes of The Rox Box/Roxette 86–06.

 Recorded at EMI Studios in Stockholm, Sweden in September 1986.

Musicians
 Marie Fredriksson – lead and background vocals
 Per Gessle – lead and background vocals
 Per "Pelle" Alsing – drums
 Tommy Cassemar – bass guitar
 Jonas Isacsson – electric guitar
 Clarence Öfwerman – keyboards and production
 Alar Suurna – engineering and mixing

Charts

References

1986 singles
Roxette songs
Songs written by Per Gessle
1986 songs
EMI Records singles
Song recordings produced by Clarence Öfwerman